The Dalnic is a right tributary of the Râul Negru in Romania. It flows into the Râul Negru near Leț.

References

Rivers of Romania
Rivers of Covasna County